A list of films produced by the Israeli film industry in 1981.

1981 releases

Unknown premiere date

See also
1981 in Israel

References

External links
 Israeli films of 1981 at the Internet Movie Database

Israeli
Film
1981